Yele Bademosi is a Nigerian entrepreneur. He is the co-founder and former CEO of Bundle which he founded in August 2019. He was also a former director at Binance Labs. He also founded tech start-up Nestcoin, a company that focuses on creating Web3 applications and investing in other startups with similar interests.

Early life and education 
Bademosi was born in 1991 and was the only male among the children by his parents. He attended the University of London for his medical studies but dropped out eventually in favour of building apps because he had an interest in computers but medicine was the preferred course of study by his father.

Career 
Bademosi started his career as a manager at Starta, a company dedicated to helping African companies launch by providing education, tools and networking opportunities. In 2017, he founded Microtraction, an angel investing firm for African startups. In 2019, he pitched an idea to Binance on what the cryptocurrency exchange should be doing in Africa and as a result was hired to become the first Director at Binance Labs. While at Binance Labs he started Bundle Africa, a cryptocurrency startup. In November 2021, along with Taiwo Orilogbon, he co-founded Nestcoin.

References 

Chief executives in the finance industry
Nigerian chief executives
Nigerian financial businesspeople
1991 births
Living people